Abdul Wadud Sardar is a Bangladesh Nationalist Party politician and the former Member of Parliament of Bakerganj-8.

Career
Sardar was elected to parliament from Bakerganj-8 as a Bangladesh Nationalist Party candidate in 1979.

References

Bangladesh Nationalist Party politicians
Living people
2nd Jatiya Sangsad members
Year of birth missing (living people)